Music Videos I is a VHS / DVD recorded by the French singer Mylène Farmer, containing all the singer's videoclips from 1984 to 1992. It was released in April 1997 in France.

This VHS includes all videos (except "Maman a tort") from the three first albums Cendres de Lune, Ainsi soit je... and L'Autre... The DVD contains also first single clip Maman a tort (1984) and the two videos of live singles.

Music Videos I was a little less sold than Music Videos II & III, which was simultaneously released.

Formats

This video is available first on VHS, Laserdisc, then on DVD in 2001.

Track listings

On VHS :

On DVD :

+ Backstage of the videos "Pourvu qu'elles soient douces" and "Désenchantée"

Credits and personnel

All videos are produced by Laurent Boutonnat.

Certifications and sales

Charts

Note: The French Videos Chart started on October 4, 2003. This video album was probably ranked higher before.

References

Mylène Farmer video albums
1997 video albums